Gimme may refer to:

Music
"Gimme" (Alice Cooper song), 2000
"Gimme" (Banks song), 2019
"Gimme" (Boom Crash Opera song),1994
"Gimme" (One song), by the Cypriot boy band One, 2002
"Gimme" (Sam Smith, Koffee, and Jessie Reyez song), 2023

Other uses
Gimme (golf), a shot agreed to be counted automatically without being actually played
Gimme (film), a 1923 American silent film directed by Rupert Hughes
Gimme! Coffee, a chain of espresso bars in the state of New York, United States

See also
Gimme Gimme (disambiguation)
Gimme Gimme Gimme (disambiguation)